Wester-Koggenland is a former municipality of the Netherlands, located in the province of North Holland and the region of West-Frisia. The municipality ceased to exist on 1 January 2007 when it merged with Obdam to form the new municipality of Koggenland.

Population centres 

The area of the former municipality of Wester-Koggenland consists of the following cities, towns, villages and/or districts: Avenhorn, Berkhout, De Goorn, Oudendijk, Rustenburg, Scharwoude, Spierdijk, Ursem, Wogmeer (partly), Zuidermeer.

Local government 

Before the merger, the last municipal council of Wester-Koggenland consisted of 15 seats, which were divided as follows:

 CDA - 5 seats
 Gemeentebelangen - 4 seats
 VVD - 3 seats
 PvdA - 2 seats
 Fractie Mollet - 1 seat

References 
 Statistics are taken from the SDU Staatscourant

Municipalities of the Netherlands disestablished in 2007
Former municipalities of North Holland
Koggenland